Ukraine competed at the 1995 Summer Universiade in Fukuoka, Japan, from 23 August to 3 September 1995. Ukraine did not compete in baseball and water polo. Ukrainian women's basketball team finished 11th, men's football team ranked 4th, and men's volleyball team placed 11th.

Medal summary

Medal by sports

Medalists

See also
 Ukraine at the 1995 Winter Universiade

References

1995 Summer Universiade
1995 in Ukrainian sport
1995